The Chicago Strangler is an unconfirmed serial killer, or serial killers, believed to be responsible for the deaths of a number of women in Chicago.

Connection of crimes 
Since 2001, at least 50 women between the ages of 18 and 58 have been murdered in a similar fashion within the city of Chicago. The victims were predominantly black, typically employed as sex workers, and often had previous experiences with the justice system. Nearly all were strangled, partially or fully stripped, and then left in abandoned buildings, alleys, garbage bins, parks, or snowdrifts. 25 of the cases were closed by police, resulting in the arrest of 13 men.

A large number of the strangulations were committed in just three police districts located on the South and West sides of Chicago. Areas with histories of violent crime and drug use such as Washington Park and Garfield Park have been common locations for these murders to occur. This pattern was recognized in 2018 through the Murder Accountability Project (MAP), which reviewed over 50 unsolved strangulation and asphyxiation cases dating as far back as 2001. The algorithm used by MAP sorts unsolved homicides by location, victim, and killing method in order to identify clusters associated with low homicide clearance rates. According to MAP, these factors could be indictive of an active serial killer.

Police response 
Following pressure from activists, the Chicago Police Department (CPD) announced the review of 51 unsolved murders of women. The CPD claimed there was no evidence that a serial killer was responsible for any of the 51 killings.

See also 
List of fugitives from justice who disappeared

References 

2000s in Chicago
2000s murders in the United States
2010s in Chicago
2010s murders in the United States
21st-century American criminals
American male criminals
American rapists
American serial killers
Crimes in Illinois
Fugitives
History of women in Illinois
Male serial killers
Murder in Illinois
Rapes in the United States
Unsolved murders in the United States
Unidentified American rapists
Unidentified American serial killers
Violence against women in the United States